was a Japanese daimyō who ruled the Aizu domain. He was the son of Gamō Ujisato. A Catholic, Hideyuki was moved to Utsunomiya (180,000 koku) in Shimotsuke Province after his father died in 1595. In 1600, he was given Aizu, worth 600,000 koku. This had been part of his father's fief. His wife was third daughter of Tokugawa Ieyasu, Furihime.

Hideyuki's eldest son Tadasato succeeded him in 1612.

Family
 Father: Gamō Ujisato
 Mother: Fuyuhime (1561–1641)
 Wife: Furi-hime (1580–1617)
 Children:
 Gamo Tadasato (1602–1627) by Furihime
 Gamo Tadatomo (1604–1634) by Furihime
 Yorihime (1602–1656) married Katō Tadahiro by Furihime

References 
 Noguchi Shin'ichi (2005). Aizu-han. Tokyo: Gendai shokan.

|-

|-

1583 births
1612 deaths
Daimyo
Gamō clan
Japanese Roman Catholics